This is the list of communities in Quebec that have the legal status of Indian settlements (établissement amérindien, code=SE) as defined by Statistics Canada.

Note these are not the same as Indian reserves (réserve indien, code=IRI), nor does it include Cree villages (code=VC), Naskapi villages (code=VK), or Northern villages (Inuit, code=VN), which have a separate legal status.

Indian settlements

Note: Oujé-Bougoumou is a village and is inhabited by Cree, but does not have the legal status of "Cree village" as defined by legislation.

See also
Indigenous peoples in Quebec
List of Indian reserves in Quebec
List of northern villages and Inuit reserved lands in Quebec
List of Cree and Naskapi territories in Quebec

References

 
Indian settlements